Hossein Kamali (born 27 July 1953) is an Iranian politician and the current secretary-general of Islamic Labour Party. He was previously Minister of Labour and Social Affairs from 1989 until 2001.

Early life
Kamali was born in Dorood in 1953.

Career
Kamali was the minister of labour under President Akbar Hashemi Rafsanjani, a post he retained under the government of Mohammad Khatami. In October 2012, he was nominated as a potential candidate for the presidential elections in 2013 but withdrew on 11 May 2013.

References

1953 births
Living people
People from Dorud
Government ministers of Iran
Members of the 1st Islamic Consultative Assembly
Members of the 2nd Islamic Consultative Assembly
Members of the 3rd Islamic Consultative Assembly
Islamic Labour Party politicians
Worker House members
Islamic Republican Party politicians
Secretaries-General of political parties in Iran